Eriothrix rufomaculatus is a fly in the family Tachinidae.

Distribution
This species is present in most of Europe and in European Russia. It can be found in Britain, where it is quite widespread throughout the country. It is also found in Ireland.

Habitat
These rather common flies mainly inhabit hedge rows, grasslands or sunny rough ground, meadows, ruderal areas and fields.

Description

This bristly species shows a greyish thorax with four narrow black stripes and a prominent but quite variable orange patches on the sides of its cylindrical abdomen, separated by a dorsal black line. Its face is silvery, with a protruding mouth edge. The legs are black. Wings are slightly shaded, yellowish at the base. Vein-m is petiolate and costal spine is longer than vein r-m.

Biology
Eriothrix rufomaculatus is a univoltine species. Adults can be found from July to October. They are flower feeders, visiting in particular members of the Umbelliferae (especially Heracleum sphondylium) and Asteraceae. The species is parasitic, the larvae developing inside the subterranean larvae of moths, especially of crambid moths (Chrysoteuchia culmella, Crambidae), tiger moths (Ammobiota festiva, Erebidae), lappet moths (Dendrolimus pini, Lasiocampidae) and ermine moths (Yponomeutidae)).

References

External links
 Eriothrix rufomaculatus at the Essex Field Club
 Tachinidae
 Gedling Conservation Trust

Dexiinae
Diptera of Europe
Diptera of Asia
Insects described in 1776
Articles containing video clips
Taxa named by Charles De Geer